Yakov Lvovich Gercberg, (Polish: Jakow Lwowicz Gercberg; Russian: Яков Львович Герцберг) born on 10 January 1898 in Warsaw; died on 26 October 1937 in Moscow) was a Polish political activist, Soviet officer of the secret services.

Gercberg was a member of the Polish Socialist Party (PPS). In 1919 he joined the Russian Communist Party (Bolsheviks). He served in the Red Army, fighting on the Western Front against Poland where he was wounded. In 1923 he joined the OGPU. He worked as an engineer at a Black Sea oil company. On 24 August 1937 he was arrested by the NKVD. After the trial during the Great Purge, he was sentenced to death on 26 October 1937 and executed.

References 

1898 births
1937 deaths
Bolsheviks
Great Purge victims from Poland
Jews from the Russian Empire
NKVD officers
Politicians from Warsaw
People from Warsaw Governorate
People of the Polish–Soviet War
Polish Socialist Party politicians
Soviet Jews in the military
Soviet people of Polish-Jewish descent
Soviet show trials
Jews executed by the Soviet Union